The Hawk is the mascot of Saint Joseph's University.  The Hawk represents the University's motto, "The Hawk Will Never Die", by flapping its wings non-stop (even during halftime) throughout every basketball game. The Hawk, who has been flapping his wings since 1956, is one of the most decorated mascots in college sports, having been called the best college mascot by ESPN College Basketball Magazine, Sports Illustrated, and The Sporting News.

The Hawk has been seen stopping its eternal flapping. In a game in 1998 against the University of Rhode Island URI's mascot, Rhody the Ram, prevented the St. Joe's Hawk from his eternal flapping by putting an inner tube over its head. This temporarily immobilized his arms. While trying to remove the tube, the Hawk's head (costume) fell off. The incident was televised on ESPN.

Hawk selection

Hawk selection has become an annual application and interview process in which a current student is selected to represent the school.  Since 1992, the student awarded the role of mascot has been recipient of an endowed scholarship and is considered a full member of the basketball team.

Awards
Sports Illustrated Mascot of the 20th Century
Sporting News Mascot of the Year 2001
"Best of Philly" award from Philadelphia Magazine in 2003-04

See also
List of U.S. college mascots

References

External links
Saint Joseph's University Site
Saint Joseph's University Official Athletics Site

Saint Joseph's Hawks
Saint Joseph's University
Atlantic 10 Conference mascots